Allison Engine Co. v. United States ex rel. Sanders, 553 U.S. 662 (2008), was a decision by the Supreme Court of the United States holding that plaintiffs under the False Claims Act must prove that the false claim was made with the specific intent of inducing the government to pay or approve payment of a false or fraudulent claim, rather than merely defrauding a contractor. Congress overruled this decision with the Fraud Enforcement and Recovery Act of 2009.

Background 
In 1985, Bath Iron Works and Ingalls Shipbuilding began construction on a new fleet of destroyers for the United States Navy.  Allison Engine was subcontracted to build generator sets for these ships, and General Tool Company was hired by Allison to assemble the system. The terms of the contracts required that the work meet strict Navy specifications. Two former employees of General Tool, Roger L. Sanders and Roger L. Thacker, filed suit in the Southern District of Ohio under the False Claims Act, alleging that Allison, General Tool, and other subcontractors had knowingly submitted invoices to the shipyards for work which did not meet the Navy requirements, and that the contractors had issued false certificates of compliance with those specifications. Sanders and Thacker, as qui tam relators, would be entitled to a portion of the government's recovery from the contractors if they prevailed in the suit.

The False Claims Act provided:

At trial, the plaintiffs introduced as evidence the alleged false invoices, but did not provide evidence of false invoices from the shipyards to the Navy. The contractor defendants moved for judgment on the grounds that the plaintiffs had not introduced any evidence of any false claims made to the Federal government. The trial court, interpreting the language of the False Claims Act, agreed and entered judgment in favor of the defendants. On appeal, the Sixth Circuit Court of Appeals reversed the trial court, deciding that it was sufficient for the plaintiffs to prove that a false claim would be paid with government money, even if it was not paid directly by the government.

Case 
The Supreme Court granted certiorari to consider what the appropriate standard for cases under §3729(a)(2) of the False Claims Act should be, and to resolve a conflict among the circuit courts. The D.C. Circuit had already decided a similar case, United States ex rel. Totten v. Bombardier Corp., finding (contrary to the Sixth Circuit) that intent for the false claim to be paid by the government was an essential element of §3729(a)(2). In their briefs to the Supreme Court, the petitioners argued that a §3729(a)(2) action must include the element of presentment: that the false claim must be made directly to the government. The government, as respondent, argued by contrast that the words "paid or approved by the Government" in the statute should be read to include any payment made with government money, however indirectly.

Writing for a unanimous court, Justice Samuel Alito notes that, "[w]hile §3729(a)(1) requires a plaintiff to prove that the defendant "present[ed]" a false or fraudulent claim to the Government, the concept of presentment is not mentioned in §3729(a)(2)."  He concludes:

The Court also considered a conspiracy claim under §3729(a)(3), and concluded that the language of that clause was sufficiently similar to clause (a)(2) that the same principle should apply. The judgment of the Sixth Circuit was vacated and the case remanded for further consideration.

Subsequent developments 
The Fraud Enforcement and Recovery Act of 2009, Pub.L. 111-21, restates the False Claims Act, replacing §3729(a)(2) with a reading closer to that advocated by the government in Allison Engine:

This has the effect of reversing the Supreme Court's decision by eliminating the specific language on which Allison Engine was decided, and thereby cease "allowing subcontractors and non-governmental entities to escape responsibility for proven frauds".

References

External links
 

United States Supreme Court cases
United States Supreme Court cases of the Roberts Court
2008 in United States case law